Michael Westergård Jensen (25 October 1916 – 23 June 1944) was a merchant and member of the Danish resistance executed by the German occupying power.

Biography 

Jensen was born in Randers on 25 October 1916 as fourth child to porter on the Hadsund railway Christen Mikael Jensen and wife Ane Johanne née Jensen and baptized Michael Westergaard Jensen in Saint Peter's Church, Randers on the second Sunday in Advent.

In 1931 Jensen was confirmed in Hadsund on the eighteenth Sunday after Trinity while residing in southern Hadsund.

In March 1944 the Gestapo made an "incredible number of arrests" including ten arrests in the region of Års, among these Jensen.

On 23 June 1944 Jensen and seven other members of the resistance were executed in Ryvangen.

After his death 
The January 1945 issue of the resistance newspaper Frit Danmark (Free Denmark) reported on the execution of the eight resistance members including Jensen.

After the liberation Jensen's remains and those of at least six of the others executed with him were found in Ryvangen and transferred to the Department of Forensic Medicine of the university of Copenhagen.

On 29 June 1945 Jensen was buried in Hadsund.

A memorial stone for Jensen and 90 other resistance members also exhumed in Ryvangen and buried in their respective home towns was laid down in Ryvangen Memorial Park.

References 

1916 births
1944 deaths
Danish people executed by Nazi Germany
Danish people of World War II
Danish resistance members
Resistance members killed by Nazi Germany
People from Randers
Danish merchants
People from Hadsund